Yough School District is a midsized, rural public school district in southwestern Pennsylvania in Westmoreland County. It serves West Newton, Herminie, Smithton, Sutersville, Madison, and Arona boroughs, the communities of Gratztown, Turkeytown, Fitzhenry, Reduction, Scott Haven and Lowber, as well as Sewickley and South Huntingdon Townships. Yough School District encompasses approximately 77 square miles. According to 2000 federal census data it serves a resident population of 17,485. In 2009, the district residents' per capita income was $16,708, while the median family income was $39,772. The district was named after the Youghiogheny River.

Schools
Yough Senior High School (Grades 9–12)
Yough Intermediate / Middle School (Grades 5–8)
HW Good Elementary (K–4)
Mendon Elementary (K–4)*West Newton Elementary (K–4)

References

External links
 Yough School District Website
 PIAA Directory Page

School districts in Westmoreland County, Pennsylvania
Education in Pittsburgh area